Cowboy Blues is a 1946 American Western film directed by Ray Nazarro and written by J. Benton Cheney. The film stars Ken Curtis, Jeff Donnell, Guy Kibbee, Guinn "Big Boy" Williams, Isabel Randolph, Mark Roberts and Peg LaCentra. The film was released on July 18, 1946, by Columbia Pictures.

Plot

Cast          
Ken Curtis as Curt Durant
Jeff Donnell as Susan Nelson
Guy Kibbee as Dusty Nelson
Guinn "Big Boy" Williams as Big Boy Stover
Isabel Randolph as Mrs. Winston 
Mark Roberts as Jerome Winston
Peg LaCentra as Lucy Armstrong
Deuce Spriggins as Band Leader Deuce
Carolina Cotton as Carolina

References

External links
 

1946 films
1940s English-language films
American Western (genre) films
1946 Western (genre) films
Columbia Pictures films
Films directed by Ray Nazarro
American black-and-white films
1940s American films